Giulio Liberati (born May 27, 1913 in Rome) was an Italian professional football player.

He played one game in the 1933/34 Serie A season for A.S. Roma. He also played for Serie C sides G.S.F. Giovanni Grion Pola and M.A.T.E.R.

See also
Football in Italy
List of football clubs in Italy

References

External links
Profile at Enciclopediadelcalcio.it

1913 births
Year of death missing
Italian footballers
Serie A players
A.S. Roma players
Association football midfielders